The 1983 Pot Black was a professional invitational snooker tournament, which was held in the Pebble Mill Studios in Birmingham. 8 players were competing in 2 four player groups. The matches are one-frame shoot-outs in the group stages, 2 frame aggregate scores in the semi-finals and the best of 3 frames in the final.

Broadcasts were on BBC2 and started at 21:00 on Monday 10 January 1983  Alan Weeks presented the programme with Ted Lowe as commentator and John Williams as referee.

First time in Pot Black this year are Tony Knowles who failed to make the semi-finals and Jimmy White who managed it before losing to Steve Davis. Davis went on to win the title beating twice champion Ray Reardon 2–0 to win his second title and the fourth man to retain it.

Main draw

Group 1

Group 2

Knockout stage

References

Pot Black
Pot Black
Pot Black
Pot Black